Herlitz is a German-Slavic language surname. It may refer to:
Annika Herlitz (1984), Swedish singer, musical performer, and voice actress
Carl Herlitz (1867–1939), German bookseller and the founder of the family business Herlitz
Carl-Gustaf Herlitz (1882–1961), Finnish business executive
Esther Herlitz (1921–2016), Israeli diplomat and politician
Günter Herlitz (1913–2010), German business man
Hermann Herlitz (1834–1920), pastor of the Lutheran Trinity Church in East Melbourne, Australia
Klaus and Eva Herlitz (died 2021), German married couple and businesspeople
Lena Persson Herlitz (1967), Swedish Amphibious Corps officer
Nils Herlitz (1888–1978), Swedish historian, legal scholar and politician

References 

German-language surnames
Swedish-language surnames
German toponymic surnames